Póvoa de Santa Iria is a city and former civil parish in the municipality of Vila Franca de Xira, Portugal. Since 2013, it is part of the civil parish Póvoa de Santa Iria e Forte da Casa. Its population in 2011 was 29,348.

History 
In 1336, the land where present-day Póvoa de Santa Iria is located was designated part of the Póvoa Majorat (Morgado da Póvoa) by Vicente Afonso Valente, for the benefit of his brother Lourenço Afonso Valente. For more than three centuries, the place was called Póvoa de São Martinho.

After the extinction of the majorats in Portugal in 1863, the settlement obtained its current name, Póvoa de Santa Iria. The settlement had a strong connection with the Tagus river and its population had fishing, salt extraction and river transport as their main activities.

In 1916 the civil parish (freguesia) of Póvoa de Santa Iria was created, as part of the Loures municipality. In 1926, the civil parish was detached from the Loures municipality and integrated in the Vila Franca de Xira municipality. In the second half of the 20th century, a sharp population increase occurred in Póvoa de Santa Iria and the settlement was mainly converted into a commuter town. Following its expansion, Póvoa de Santa Iria was formally designated a town (vila) in 1985 and a city (cidade) in 1999. After a major territorial administration reorganization in Portugal in 2013, the civil parish of Póvoa de Santa Iria was merged with the neighboring civil parish of Forte da Casa.

In November 2014, Póvoa de Santa Iria was one of the locations most affected by a legionellosis outbreak in the Vila Franca de Xira municipality.

Transportation 
Póvoa de Santa Iria is served by the Póvoa train station, which is part of the Linha do Norte. It is an important point of connection with the city of Lisbon.

The city is also served by multiple bus lines from Rodoviária de Lisboa, connecting with other points in the municipalities of Vila Franca de Xira, Loures and Lisbon.

Sports 
Póvoa de Santa Iria's football club is União Atlético Povoense, which competes in the First Division of the Lisbon Football Association.

References

External links 

 Junta de Freguesia Póvoa de Santa Iria e Forte da Casa (in Portuguese)

Cities in Portugal
Former parishes of Vila Franca de Xira